Karin Kessler (née Rettmeyer; born 25 March 1939) is a German female former track and field athlete who competed for West Germany in the 800 metres. She was the gold medallist in that event at the 1967 European Indoor Games, having been runner-up to Zsuzsa Szabó the previous year at the 1966 European Indoor Games. Kessler also represented her country at the 1966 European Athletics Championships, reaching the semi-finals. She set a personal best of 2:03.6 minutes in 1967, which was a West German record for the Hamburg-born athlete.

Kessler was a five-time national champion individually, taking both indoor and outdoor 800 m titles in 1966 and 1967, as well as a short course cross country title in 1966. During her career she was a member of Düsseldorfer SV 04 and LG Alstertal / Garstedt Hamburg clubs.

International competitions

National titles
West German Athletics Championships
800 m: 1966, 1967
West German Indoor Athletics Championships
800 m: 1966, 1967
West German Cross Country Championships
Short course: 1967

See also
List of European Athletics Indoor Championships medalists (women)

References

Living people
1939 births
Athletes from Hamburg
West German female middle-distance runners
German female middle-distance runners
20th-century German women